The Manx Northern Railway (MNR) was the second common carrier railway built in the Isle of Man.  It operated as an independent concern only from 1879 to 1905.

History 
When the people in the town of Ramsey realised their town was not going to be incorporated into the newly promoted Isle of Man Railway (IOMR) network in the 1870s it was left to them to promote their own railway as a link with the rest of the island. The rugged geography of the east coast forced the Manx Northern Railway into an indirect route: first westwards to Kirk Michael and then south to St John's where a junction could be made with the Isle of Man Railway's Peel to Douglas line which opened in 1873.

Built to a common Manx gauge, a  narrow gauge, construction began in 1878 and the railway opened for business without formality on 23 September 1879. It was operated by the Isle of Man Railway until 6 November 1880 when the MNR took over the responsibility. In 1881, passenger services started operating through to Douglas using running rights over the tracks of the Isle of Man Railway.

Some significant engineering works were required on the west coast section of the line, including the bridging of Glen Wyllin (at Kirk Michael) and the nearby Glen Mooar. An embankment high on the cliffs south of Glen Mooar, the "Donkey Bank", was an unending maintenance problem and a drain upon the line's profitability. To try to stabilise the track, this section was the only part of the Manx railways to have its rails mounted in chairs. The rest of the system had the rails directly spiked to the sleepers.

Between Kirk Michael and Ballaugh, the MNR had a halt purely for the use of the Bishop of Sodor and Man at Bishop's Court. A simple wooden bench comprised the station's entire facilities.

The northern part of the line was flat compared to the western coastal section, and had numerous hand-worked level crossings. These were so close together in places that the protecting signals for one crossing stood beside the previous crossing up the line. A distinctive lattice girder bridge, the "basket bridge", was built over the Sulby River near Ramsey. It was renewed in 1914.

The MNR had the only dockside track on the railway system, allowing direct transfer between the railway and sea-going vessels. This line, at Ramsey, opened in 1883 and closed in 1952. Various schemes to emulate this in Douglas were often proposed but the work was never undertaken.

Post-Amalgamation

The Manx Northern Railway was not independent for long. In 1905, it became part of the Isle of Man Railway Company when that company took over the operation of the entire system, nearly 47 miles of track. A depression in the mining industry resulted in the closure of the Foxdale Mines in 1911 with the resultant loss of traffic. Services to Foxdale ceased in 1940 but the odd ballast train continued to collect mine waste up to the early 1960s. The Ramsey route had a brief boom between the wars and after World War II, but then, in line with the rest of the system, patronage sharply declined. The whole railway system reached a crisis in 1966 when no services operated. After a brief revival when the system was leased by the Marquess of Ailsa, the rest of the former Manx Northern Railway closed for 1968 along with the original IOMR Douglas-Peel line. One of the last services was the transport of fuel oil from the electricity generating station at Peel to the one at Ramsey, for which a special siding was laid. The last oil train ran in April 1969. The track was lifted in 1974 and the Glen Wyllin and Glen Mooar viaducts were dismantled in 1975. The majority of the six-wheeled coaching stock was also lost at this time, having been stored out of use for many years on a siding at St. John's station in the open air.

Stations

Main line

Foxdale branch

The Foxdale Railway

A separate undertaking, the Foxdale Railway, was promoted by the MNR and worked by them from opening in 1886.  This line branched southwards from St John's and allowed lead and silver ores from the mines at Foxdale to be delivered directly to the dock side in Ramsey.

Milntown Railway
The Milntown Railway was a short  narrow gauge spur off the ex Manx Northern line just south of the terminus at Ramsey, Isle of Man. It was constructed only in the final year of operation for the purposes of transporting fuel oil from Peel to Ramsey by rail. The siding was a direct spur off the main line and was on a very tight curve directly into the yard that it served.  Short-lived, it did however have the distinction of being the reason for one of the last trains to travel over the line in April 1969 prior to lifting.

Locomotives 

Two 2-4-0 side tank locomotives were ordered from Sharp, Stewart and Company for the opening of the line.  Numbered 1 and 2, they were named Ramsey and Northern respectively.  In 1880, the MNR acquired a third locomotive from Beyer, Peacock and Company to a design similar to those used on the Isle of Man Railway.  Given the number 3 and named Thornhill, it was built alongside the IOMR’s engine number 7 – Tynwald – in Beyer, Peacock’s Manchester works.  In 1885 it was realised that a much more powerful locomotive was required for working the mineral traffic on the Foxdale Railway.  This time they turned to Dübs and Company, Glasgow for an 0-6-0 tank locomotive.  This powerful engine, numbered 4, bore the name Caledonia.  When they were taken into Isle of Man Railway stock, they were renumbered as a continuation of the then IOMR series.  Thornhill became number 14 and Caledonia became number 15.  Ramsey and Northern were allocated numbers 16 and 17 respectively but never bore them in service.  After very little use by the IOMR they were scrapped in 1923 and 1912.

Passenger stock 

For the opening of passenger services, the Manx Northern Railway ordered fourteen six-wheeled coaches built to the Cleminson system, a first on the island and using a complex system of six-wheeled arrangement whereby the middle set were not fixed.  This arrangement allowed the outer wheels to pivot and the centre pair to slide from side to side thus allowing the coached to more easily negotiate tight curves than a rigid wheelbase.  Expensively constructed, they proved to be troublesome in traffic, so much so that in  service after the amalgamation with the Isle of Man Railway Company they saw little further use, occasionally being used for school traffic.  A number of examples survive in preservation (see below).  For the Foxdale branch a special bogie coach with enhanced braking capabilities was constructed by the Oldbury Carriage and Wagon Co. in 1886.  It was a composite coach with a guard’s compartment, three third class compartments and one first class compartment specially for the Foxdale Mines’ Captain. To celebrate the centenary of the Manx Northern Railway in 1979, the coach was restored to its original livery. which it carried until 2001 when it reverted to the standard livery of red and cream.  It remains in regular service today.  Almost all of the original non-passenger stock was lost with only one closed van surviving today (Gr.12) which was rebuilt in 2001.

Survivors

Today, many of the station buildings along the line survive and have been converted to form a variety of uses including a village fire station, several private dwellings and museum displays.  Of the locomotives, No. 3 Thornhill is in private preservation in the north of the island having been purchased in 1978 and removed from the railway; No. 4 Caledonia was returned service in 1995 and remains in sporadic service (although as of 2011 it is undergoing a complete rebuild and is expected to return to traffic in 2012) whilst the first two locomotives built by Sharp, Stewart and Company did not survive.  At least one six-wheeled coach has been purchased for preservation as part of a private collection in the UK but this is not publicly accessible.

Three of the unusual six-wheeled coaches survive on the island with one accompanying Thornhill in private ownership and two on the railway: one without its running gear and another in private ownership having spent 1976–1998 in the Port Erin Railway Museum.  The unique Foxdale Coach survives in regular traffic on the south line, and a goods van (Gr. 12) was rebuilt in 1997 and remains in use on the line.  As part of the annual transport festival a genuine Manx Northern Train has operated in recent times.  Many smaller items survive in use on the railway today, such as signal levers and various point levers inherited in 1905 and transferred around the system.

See also

 Isle of Man Railway
 Isle of Man Railway stations
 Isle of Man Railway level crossings and points of interest
 Transport on the Isle of Man
 Heritage railways in the Isle of Man
 British narrow gauge railways
 Worsley Works produces kits of IoMR rolling stock

Notes

References
Basnett, S. (2008) Trains of the Isle of Man: The twilight years, Ramsey, Isle of Man : Lily Publications, 
Boyd, J.I.C. (1993) The Isle of Man Railway: Volume 1, An outline History of the Isle of Man Railway including the Manx Northern Railway and The Foxdale Railway, (Pre-1873 to 1904) The Oakwood Press, 
Boyd, J.I.C. (1996) The Isle of Man Railway: Volume 3, An outline History of the Isle of Man Railway including the Manx Northern Railway and The Foxdale Railway, The Oakwood Press, 
Heavyside, T. (2004) Douglas to Ramsey including the Foxdale Branch, Narrow Gauge Lines Series, Mitchell, V. (Ed.), Middleton Press, 
Hendry, R. (1993) Rails in the Isle of Man: A Colour Celebration, Midland Publishing Limited, 
Hendry, R.P. and Hendry, R.P. (1980) The Manx Northern Railway, Rugby : Hillside, 
Peters, Ivo (1976) The Narrow Gauge Charm of Yesterday: A pictorial tribute, Oxford Publishing Company, pictures 231–249, 
Welbourn, N. (2000) Lost Lines: British Narrow Gauge, Ian Allan, p. 87-92, 
Winter, Robin G. (2007) The Isle of Man Railway, A Modeller's Inspiration, Peco Publications, 
Wyse, W.J. and Joyce, J. (1968) "Rail transport in the Isle of Man 1873-1968: Isle of Man Railway", In: Isle of Man Album, Shepperton : Ian Allan, p. 9-11,

External links
Photo of MNR signal
Isle of Man Transport
Isle of Man Guide - Steam Railway
Radial-Axle Passenger Tramcar, by Mr. James Cleminson

Gallery

Early British railway companies
3 ft gauge railways in the Isle of Man
Railway lines in the Isle of Man
Railway lines opened in 1879
Railway companies disestablished in 1905